Lake Barkley State Resort Park is a park on the eastern shore of Lake Barkley just west of Cadiz, Kentucky in Trigg County. The park encompasses  and is one of three Kentucky parks near Land Between the Lakes, a  isthmus between Kentucky Lake and Lake Barkley.

References

External links
 Lake Barkley State Resort Park Kentucky Department of Parks

State parks of Kentucky
Protected areas of Trigg County, Kentucky